The Henrician Articles or King Henry's Articles (Polish: Artykuły henrykowskie, Latin: Articuli Henriciani) were a permanent contract between the "Polish nation" (the szlachta, or nobility, of the Polish–Lithuanian Commonwealth) and a newly elected king upon his election to the throne. It stated the fundamental principles of governance and constitutional law in the Polish–Lithuanian Commonwealth.

While pacta conventa comprised only the personal undertakings of the king-elect, the Henrician Articles were a permanent constitution that all kings-elect had to swear to respect.

The articles functioned, essentially, as a first constitution for Poland until the Constitution of 3 May 1791.

Origins 
The charter took the form of 18 Articles written and adopted by the nobility in 1573 at the town of Kamień, near Warsaw, during the interregnum following the extinction of the Jagiellon dynasty.  The document took its name from that of Henry of Valois, the first Polish king elected in a free election, who was obliged to sign the Articles before being allowed to ascend the throne. Subsequently, every king-elect was required to swear fidelity to them, as is contrasted with the similar documents, the pacta conventa, which were tailored and different for each king-elect. Acceptance by the king-elect of the articles was a condition of his elevation to the throne, and they formed part of the royal oath at the coronation.

Provisions 

 Kings were to be chosen by election by the szlachta, and his children had no right of inheritance with regard to the throne.
 Kings' marriages had to gain the approval of the Senate.
 The king had to convene a general sejm (Polish parliament) at least once every two years for six weeks.
 The king had no right to create new taxes, tariffs or such without approval of the Sejm;
 Between sejms, 16 resident senators were to be at the king's side as his advisers and overseers. The Royal Council of 16 senators was elected every two years during the Sejm's session. Four of their number (rotating every six months) were obliged to accompany the king and serve as advisers and supervisors to ensure that the king made no decision contrary to the laws of the Commonwealth. All royal decrees had to be counterstamped by the chancellors or the deputy chancellors.
 The king had no right to call a pospolite ruszenie (levée en masse) without approval of the Sejm. Further, the Articles upheld the informal tradition that the king could not send those troops to serve outside the Commonwealth's borders without compensation.
 The standing royal army (wojsko kwarciane) was provided for.
 The king had no right to declare war or peace without approval of the Sejm.
 The king had to abide by the Warsaw Confederation's guarantees of religious freedom.
 If the king were to transgress against the law or the privileges of szlachta, the szlachta could refuse the king's orders and act against him (in Polish, it became known as the rokosz). Each king had to swear that "if anything has been done by Us against laws, liberties, privileges or customs, we declare all the inhabitants of the Kingdom are freed from obedience to Us".

See also

 Golden Liberty

References

Constitutions of Poland
Legal history of Poland
1573 in law
Political charters
Legal history of Lithuania
Henry III of France
Law by former country
1573 in the Polish–Lithuanian Commonwealth